Mordellistena arabica is a beetle in the genus Mordellistena of the family Mordellidae. It was described in 1904 by Chobaut.

References

arabica
Beetles described in 1904